Frank Richard Meachem (1907-1973) was an English boxer. He fought as Freddie Meachem.

Boxing
He competed in the featherweight class at the 1930 British Empire Games for England where he won a gold medal.

He was three times England's Amateur Boxing Association Senior Champion in 1928 and 1929 representing Civil Service ABC at featherweight and also the 1932 lightweight champion.

Personal life
He was a civil servant at the time of the 1930 Games.

References

1907 births
1973 deaths
English male boxers
Commonwealth Games medallists in boxing
Commonwealth Games gold medallists for England
Boxers at the 1930 British Empire Games
Featherweight boxers
Medallists at the 1930 British Empire Games